El magnate, is an American telenovela created and produced by Telemundo and Ángel del Cerro in 1990.

Cast 
 Ruddy Rodríguez as Teresa / María Fernández
 Andrés García as Gonzalo Santillán
 Salvador Pineda as Rodrigo Valverde
 Laura Fabián as Celeste
 Griselda Nogueras as Aretusa
 Pilar Brescia Álvarez as Meche
 Osvaldo Calvo as Pedro
 Teresa María Rojas as Elena
 Zully Montero as Antonia
 Luis Montero as Agenor
 Manolo Villaverde as Pedro
 Carmen Mora as Francisca
 Vivian Ruiz as Carmen 
 German Barrios as Ernesto
 Ricardo Pald as Julio
 Velia Martínez as Antonieta
 Marylin Romero as Inés
 Rosa Felipe as Magdalena
 Carlos Cano as Mayor
 Christina Page as Belisa
 Jorge Raúl Guerrero as Doctor

External links 
 

Telemundo telenovelas
1990 telenovelas